Real Brothas is the debut album of rappers B.G. Knocc Out and Dresta, released in 1995. The album includes the minor hits "D.P.G./K", "Jealousy" and the Eazy-E-dedicated song "50/50 Luv". "D.P.G./K" was a diss track towards Death Row artists Snoop Doggy Dogg, Dr. Dre, Dat Nigga Daz, Kurupt and Nate Dogg. 
Music videos were made for "D.P.G/K", "50/50", and "Jealousy". A music video for "Compton Swangin'" was made but never released. The album sold approximately 250,000 copies without any promotional advertising. The album had been out of print and sought after for many years, but on December 2, 2014 the album was re-released in Japan.

Track listing

Charts

References 

1995 debut albums
Def Jam Recordings albums
G-funk albums
West Coast hip hop albums
Albums produced by Rhythum D